Melton Mowbray North railway station was a railway station in Melton Mowbray, Leicestershire, England on the Great Northern and London and North Western Joint Railway.

The station was built of red brick but with lavish ornamentation in the classical style. There were two platforms connected by a subway.

Opening
The station opened on 1 September 1879 with services to Nottingham (London Road). The routes to Grantham and Newark and south to Market Harborough opened on 15 December.

Services
Initially the main services were Northampton to Nottingham and Northampton to Newark, provided by the London and North Western Railway, and Melton to Grantham provided by the Great Northern Railway. Other services were attempted but were short lived.

The through Newark services were not a success and were withdrawn on 1 May 1882, replaced by connecting trains from Harby & Stathern in order to cut costs.

On 1 January 1883 the GNR opened their line from Marefield Junction, on the joint line to the south, to their new station at Leicester (Belgrave Road). The company then replaced their Melton to Grantham service with a through Leicester to Grantham service.

The Newark connections from Harby & Stathern were gradually withdrawn. In 1910 the service comprised one train each way between Leicester and Newark which interconnected with a Northampton to Nottingham train at Harby. This service was withdrawn by 1922. Passengers to Newark then had to change at either Radcliffe-on-Trent or Grantham.

Closure
Regular services ceased on 7 December 1953 but summer specials, mainly Leicester to Skegness or Mablethorpe, survived until 1962, and through goods traffic lasted until 1964.

Since closure the station buildings and the nearby Scalford Road bridge have been demolished and replaced by retail units. However a short distance to the north, in Melton Country Park, the formation can be accessed. It can then be walked to just south of Scalford, mainly on an embankment.

Summary of Former Services

Timetable for April 1910
The table below shows the train departures from Melton Mowbray North in April 1910.

References

External links
Melton Mowbray north railway station

Disused railway stations in Leicestershire
Railway stations in Great Britain opened in 1879
Railway stations in Great Britain closed in 1953
Former Great Northern Railway stations
Former London and North Western Railway stations
Melton Mowbray